The Invisible Circus is a 2001 American drama film written and directed by Adam Brooks and starring Jordana Brewster, Christopher Eccleston, and Cameron Diaz. Based on the 1995 novel The Invisible Circus by Jennifer Egan, the film is about a teenage girl who travels to Europe in 1976 in search of answers to her older sister's suicide. During her search, she falls in love with her dead sister's former boyfriend. The film premiered at the Sundance Film Festival on January 11, 2001, and was released in the United States on February 2, 2001.

Plot
In 1976 San Francisco, Phoebe O'Connor is plagued by the mystery surrounding the death of her free-spirited older sister, Faith, who left the United States for Europe when Phoebe was 12 years old, and was subsequently found dead at the base of a precipice in Portugal. Faith's death was ruled a suicide, but Phoebe is skeptical of this claim.

Against the wishes of her mother, Gail, Phoebe departs for Europe hoping to uncover more information about the last year of Faith's life. In Amsterdam, she tracks Faith's boyfriend, Wolf, an Englishman who left San Francisco with Faith. Wolf blames Faith's suicide on drug use, thrillseeking, and a hedonistic lifestyle; he recalls his last moments with Faith in July 1970, when she decided to travel to Berlin to join the Red Army Faction.

After Phoebe has a disturbing vision of Faith in the street, she is invited by Wolf to stay with him and his wife, a French woman named Claire. Wolf recollects Faith's eagerness to be engage in radical political protests, including terrorism, which frightened him. Phoebe, wanting to see where her sister last lived, plans to travel to Portugal. Wolf, though initially reluctant, agrees to accompany her on the trip. Soon, their relationship turns romantic.

Phoebe and Wolf make their way to the seaside village where Faith died. When they arrive at the cliffside where Faith died, Wolf further elaborates on Faith's terrorist involvement with the Red Army Faction, including a bomb detonation in Berlin which resulted in the death of an innocent man. Upon reuniting with Faith in Portugal, Wolf found her riddled with guilt, and she made him promise to never tell her family that she was responsible for a man's death. In the midst of a nap on the beach, Wolf awoke to Faith standing on the edge of a rock wall along the cliff. Though he attempted to coax her back, he was unable to stop her from leaping to her death. Phoebe and Wolf embrace, and light a candle for Faith in a nearby cathedral.

Cast

Reception
The film received negative reviews from critics and holds a 22% rating on Rotten Tomatoes based on 63 reviews.

References

External links
 
 

2001 films
2001 independent films
2001 drama films
Adultery in films
American drama films
American independent films
Cultural depictions of the Red Army Faction
Films about sisters
Films based on American novels
Films directed by Adam Brooks
Films set in Amsterdam
Films set in Berlin
Films set in Portugal
Films shot in Portugal
Films set in San Francisco
Films set in the 1970s
Hippie films
2000s English-language films
2000s American films